Royal Air Force Maghaberry or more simply RAF Maghaberry is a former Royal Air Force satellite airfield located north of Maghaberry, County Antrim, Northern Ireland. The site of former RAF Maghaberry was transformed into HM Prison Maghaberry.

History

The following units were here at some point:
 No. 5 (Coastal) Operational Training Unit RAF (OTU) (February - September 1943)
 Satellite Landing Ground for No. 23 Maintenance Unit RAF (January 1945 - October 1946)
 'A' Flight of No. 104 (Transport) OTU RAF (September - October 1943)
 No. 231 Squadron RAF
 No. 306 Ferry Training Unit RAF (June - October 1943)
 No. 2775 Squadron RAF Regiment
USAAF
 311th Ferry Squadron
 312th Ferry Squadron
 321st Air Transport Squadron
 325th Ferry Squadron

References

Citations

Bibliography

Maghaberry